Tony Wike is a retired voice actor and broadcaster based in Omaha. Previously, he was morning anchor and reporter for radio stations KFAB-AM and KGOR-FM, where he won the Nebraska Broadcasters award for Best Newscast in 2010.  He also anchored morning news for stations in Augusta GA, Columbus GA and Greenville SC, along with anchoring sports for the Georgia News Network.

Before that, he was morning anchor and reporter for radio station WDUN-AM in Gainesville, GA, where he won the 2008 Georgia AP  award for Best Newscast in Class B. He also is a freelance voiceover announcer for clients such as Ringling Bros. Barnum & Bailey Circus, The Pee Wee Herman Show, Godfather's Pizza, Country Music Television and Lozier Inc.

In 2003, he was elected to the Nebraska Radio Personalities Hall of Fame.

He voiced characters in several animated series, including Street Sharks, Archie's Weird Mysteries and Liberty's Kids.

He also appeared in two movies, Citizen Ruth and A Thousand Heroes.

External links
Tony Wike voiceover website

Year of birth missing (living people)
Living people
American male voice actors
Place of birth missing (living people)
American radio personalities
Radio personalities from Atlanta